This is a list of territories which are directly administered, or once were, by the United Nations (UN). These are not to be confused with UN trust territories, which were run by a single country under a UN mandate.

List

Current

Former

See also
 Extraterritoriality
 Extraterritorial jurisdiction
 Extraterritorial operation
 Free City of Danzig
 Free Territory of Trieste
 International city
 International waters
 International zone
 Klaipėda Region (Memel Territory)
 League of Nations mandate
 Outer Space Treaty
 Territory of the Saar Basin
 United Nations list of non-self-governing territories
 United Nations Transition Assistance Group
 United Nations trust territories

United Nations Security Council mandates
Geography-related lists